Guus "Guusje" ter Horst (born 22 March 1952) is a retired Dutch politician of the Labour Party (PvdA) and psychologist. She is a member of the supervisory board of Royal Dutch Shell since 1 January 2013 and chairwoman of the supervisory board of the Institute for Sound and Vision since 11 July 2011.

Biography 
Ter Horst attended school in The Hague and subsequently studied at University of Amsterdam where she obtained a MSc degree in psychology. In 1984 she received a PhD degree in social science on her thesis concerning the question how people who never go to the dentist can be made to do so. Between 1986 and 1994 she was associate professor of Social Dentistry at the subfaculty of Dentistry of the University of Amsterdam.

In 1984 Ter Horst joined the Labour Party (PvdA). In 1986 she was elected to the Amsterdam municipal council. In 1994 she became alderwoman, responsible for spatial planning, she initiated a major renovation of the city of Amsterdam.

In 2001 she became mayor of Nijmegen. During her six-year term, she moved to a new house every year, to get to know the city. In August 2006 Ter Horst was fined for drunk driving, strangely, without political consequence. On 1 January 2007 her term as mayor ended and she did not pursue a second one. She was succeeded by Thom de Graaf.

In 2010 Ter Horst received one of the Dutch Big Brother Awards for her lack of nuance in the privacy debate. Her project of a centrally organised fingerprint database for passports won an award as well. She resigned, together with all PvdA ministers, on the morning of 20 February 2010. The Queen accepted the resignation on 23 February 2010.

Decorations

References

External links

Official
  Dr. G. (Guusje) ter Horst Parlement & Politiek
  Dr. G. ter Horst (PvdA) Eerste Kamer der Staten-Generaal

 

1952 births
Living people
Dutch academic administrators
Dutch corporate directors
Dutch nonprofit executives
Dutch nonprofit directors
Dutch psychologists
Dutch women psychologists
Female interior ministers
Labour Party (Netherlands) politicians
Mayors of Amsterdam
Mayors of Nijmegen
Members of the Senate (Netherlands)
Ministers of the Interior of the Netherlands
Ministers of Kingdom Relations of the Netherlands
Municipal councillors of Amsterdam
Officers of the Order of Orange-Nassau
People from Deventer
Shell plc people
University of Amsterdam alumni
Academic staff of the University of Amsterdam
Women mayors of places in the Netherlands
Women government ministers of the Netherlands
20th-century Dutch civil servants
20th-century Dutch educators
20th-century Dutch scientists
20th-century Dutch women politicians
20th-century Dutch politicians
21st-century Dutch civil servants
21st-century Dutch educators
21st-century Dutch scientists
21st-century Dutch women politicians
21st-century Dutch politicians
20th-century women educators
21st-century women educators